Dennis Harrison, Jr. (born July 31, 1956 in Cleveland, Ohio) is a former professional American football player who played ten seasons in the National Football League.  He played in Super Bowl XV for the Philadelphia Eagles and was selected to the Pro Bowl after the 1982 season. In 1983, he led the Philadelphia Eagles in sacks with 13.5 on the season.

Harrison starred at defensive tackle at Vanderbilt University, where he was voted All SEC in 1978 by United Press International. As a freshman, he was named the defensive player of the game in the 1974 Peach Bowl against Texas Tech.

Harrison was the first black assistant football coach at Franklin Road Academy. He left in 1997 for a coaching position at Vanderbilt University.

Harrison is currently a coach and gym teacher for middle school football, track, and girls basketball at Brentwood Middle School in Brentwood, Tennessee.
His daughter, Isabelle, played basketball at Tennessee and was selected as the 12th pick in 2015 WNBA Draft by the Phoenix Mercury. His son David Harrison was named to the 2001 McDonald's All-American game before a standout career at the University of Colorado - Boulder. He was drafted in the first round of the 2004 NBA Draft to the Indiana Pacers.

References

1956 births
Living people
Players of American football from Cleveland
American football defensive ends
Vanderbilt Commodores football players
Philadelphia Eagles players
Los Angeles Rams players
San Francisco 49ers players
Atlanta Falcons players
National Conference Pro Bowl players